This is a list of National Hockey League (NHL) players who have played at least one game in the NHL from 1917 to present and have a last name that starts with "D".

List updated as of the 2018–19 NHL season.

D'A–Da

 Matt D'Agostini
 Corrie D'Alessio
 Jerry D'Amigo
 Hank D'Amore
 Marc D'Amour
 Kirby Dach
 Andreas Dackell
 Doug Dadswell
 Byron Dafoe
 Pierre Dagenais
 Kevin Dahl
 Klas Dahlbeck
 Ulf Dahlen
 Kjell Dahlin
 Rasmus Dahlin
 Toni Dahlman
 Chris Dahlquist
 Carl "Cully" Dahlstrom (born 1912)
 Carl Dahlstrom (born 1995)
 Alain Daigle
 Alexandre Daigle
 J. J. Daigneault
 Bob Dailey
 Michael Dal Colle
 Frank Daley
 Joe Daley
 Patrick Daley
 Trevor Daley
 Brad Dalgarno
 Kevin Dallman
 Marty Dallman
 Rod Dallman
 Zac Dalpe
 Napoleon Dame
 Nick Damore
 Jean-Francois Damphousse
 Vincent Damphousse
 Phillip Danault
 Mathieu Dandenault
 Ken Daneyko
 Jeff Daniels
 Kimbi Daniels
 Scott Daniels
 Yann Danis
 Marko Dano
 Oscar Dansk
 Mike Danton
 Dan Daoust
 Craig Darby
 Mathieu Darche
 Mike Dark
 Scott Darling
 Harold Darragh
 Jack Darragh
 Cleon Daskalakis
 Pavel Datsyuk
 Laurent Dauphin
 Richard David
 Bob Davidson
 Brandon Davidson
 Gordon Davidson
 John Davidson
 Matt Davidson
 Johan Davidsson
 Jonathan Davidsson
 Bob Davie
 Jeremy Davies
 Ken Davies
 Bob Davis
 Kim Davis
 Lorne Davis
 Mal Davis
 Murray Davison
 Rob Davison
 Evgeny Davydov
 Jeff Daw
 Jason Dawe
 Bob Dawes
 Nigel Dawes
 Clarence "Hap" Day
 Joe Day
 Eric Daze

De

 Dean De Fazio
 Calvin de Haan
 Jacob de la Rose
 Chase De Leo
 Greg De Vries
 Billy Dea
 Jean-Sebastien Dea
 Don Deacon
 Adam Deadmarsh
 Butch Deadmarsh
 Barry Dean
 Kevin Dean
 Tony DeAngelo
 Nelson DeBenedet
 Lucien DeBlois
 Dave Debol
 Alex DeBrincat
 Jake DeBrusk
 Louie DeBrusk
 Bob DeCourcy
 Brad DeFauw
 Brandon DeFazio
 Norm Defelice
 Dale DeGray
 Denis DeJordy
 Danny DeKeyser
 Aaron Dell
 Ty Dellandrea
 Michael Del Zotto
 Matt DelGuidice
 Collin Delia
 Jonathan Delisle
 Xavier Delisle
 Armand Delmonte
 Andy Delmore
 Gilbert Delorme
 Ron Delorme
 Val Delory
 Guy Delparte
 Alex Delvecchio
 Ab DeMarco
 Ab DeMarco, Jr.
 Dylan DeMelo
 Jason Demers
 Tony Demers
 Pavol Demitra
 Thatcher Demko
 Nathan Dempsey
 Jean-Paul Denis
 Louis Denis
 Marc Denis
 Grigori Denisenko
 Corbett Denneny
 Cy Denneny
 Norm Dennis
 Gerry Denoird
 Larry DePalma
 Bill Derlago
 Travis Dermott
 Philippe DeRouville
 Gerry Desaulniers
 Matthieu Descoteaux
 Joffre Desilets
 David Desharnais
 Andrew Desjardins
 Cedrick Desjardins
 Eric Desjardins
 Gerry Desjardins
 Martin Desjardins
 Victor Desjardins
 Jacques Deslauriers
 Jeff Deslauriers
 Nicolas Deslauriers
 Casey DeSmith
 Simon Despres
 Patrick DesRochers
 Jarrett Deuling
 Boyd Devereaux
 Jamie Devane
 Kevin Devine
 Tom "Moose" Dewar
 Al Dewsbury
 Michel Deziel

Dh–Di

 Marcel "Ching" Dheere
 Phillip Di Giuseppe
 Thomas Di Pauli
 Ed Diachuk
 Raphael Diaz
 Harry Dick
 Ernie Dickens
 Herb Dickenson
 Bill Dickie
 Jason Dickinson
 Chris DiDomenico
 Gerald Diduck
 Don Dietrich
 Darren Dietz
 Bob Dill
 Bob Dillabough
 Brenden Dillon
 Cecil Dillon
 Gary Dillon
 Wayne Dillon
 Rob DiMaio
 Niko Dimitrakos
 Bill Dineen
 Gary Dineen
 Gord Dineen
 Kevin Dineen
 Peter Dineen
 Chris Dingman
 Chuck "Dinny" Dinsmore
 Connie Dion
 Michel Dion
 Gilbert Dionne
 Marcel Dionne
 Joe DiPenta
 Michael DiPietro
 Paul DiPietro
 Rick DiPietro
 Robert Dirk
 Jon DiSalvatore
 Reinhard Divis
 Tomas Divisek

Dj–Do

 Christian Djoos
 Par Djoos
 Gary Doak
 Shane Doan
 Brian Dobbin
 Jim Dobson
 Noah Dobson
 Fred Doherty
 Jason Doig
 Bobby Dollas
 Robert Dome
 Hnat Domenichelli
 Max Domi
 Tie Domi
 Louis Domingue
 Gary Donaldson
 Clark Donatelli
 Ryan Donato
 Ted Donato
 Dave Donnelly
 Gord Donnelly
 James "Babe" Donnelly
 Mike Donnelly
 Matt Donovan
 Shean Donovan
 Joonas Donskoi
 Jamie Doornbosch
 Jiri Dopita
 Rob Dopson
 John Doran
 Lloyd "Red" Doran
 Ken Doraty
 Andre Dore
 Daniel Dore
 Jim Dorey
 Dan Dorion
 Gary Dornhoefer
 Ed Dorohoy
 Derek Dorsett
 Jake Dotchin
 Drew Doughty
 Jordy Douglas
 Kent Douglas
 Les Douglas
 Doug Doull
 Peter Douris
 Jim Dowd
 Nic Dowd
 Bruce Dowie
 Justin Dowling
 Aaron Downey
 Dave Downie
 Steve Downie
 Mario Doyon

Dr

 Leon Draisaitl
 Dallas Drake
 Bruce Draper
 Kris Draper
 Tom Draper
 Davis Drewiske
 Sheldon Dries
 Gordie Drillon
 Peter Driscoll
 Bruce Driver
 Rene Drolet
 Ivan Droppa
 Clarence Drouillard
 Jonathan Drouin
 Jude Drouin
 P. C. Drouin
 Polly Drouin
 John Druce
 Harold Druken
 Stan Drulia
 Jim Drummond
 Chris Drury
 Herb Drury
 Ted Drury
 Dave Dryden
 Ken Dryden
 Jamie Drysdale

Du–Dz

 Christian Dube
 Dillon Dube
 Gilles Dube
 Norm Dube
 Justin Duberman
 Wade Dubielewicz
 Brandon Dubinsky
 Steve Dubinsky
 Devan Dubnyk
 Pierre-Luc Dubois
 Matt Duchene
 Gaetan Duchesne
 Steve Duchesne
 Anthony Duclair
 Rick Dudley
 Dave Duerden
 Dick Duff
 Parris Duffus
 Luc Dufour
 Marc Dufour
 Donald Dufresne
 Jack Duggan
 Ken Duggan
 Ron Duguay
 Lorne Duguid
 Woody Dumart
 Michel Dumas
 Mathew Dumba
 Gabriel Dumont
 Jean-Pierre Dumont
 Brian Dumoulin
 Dale Dunbar
 Art Duncan
 Iain Duncan
 Craig Duncanson
 Rocky Dundas
 Mike Dunham
 Frank Dunlap
 Blake Dunlop
 Dave Dunn
 Richie Dunn
 Vince Dunn
 Josh Dunne
 Denis Dupere
 Andre Dupont
 Jerry Dupont
 Micki DuPont
 Norm Dupont
 Yanick Dupre
 Bob Dupuis
 Pascal Dupuis
 Steve Durbano
 Vitezslav Duris
 Bill Durnan
 Chris Durno
 Sean Durzi
 Norm Dussault
 L. S. Dutkowski
 Mervyn "Red" Dutton
 Christian Dvorak
 Miroslav Dvorak
 Radek Dvorak
 Gordie Dwyer
 Mike Dwyer
 Patrick Dwyer
 Ed Dyck
 Henry Dyck
 Cecil "Babe" Dye
 Karl Dykhuis
 Steve Dykstra
 Jack Dyte
 Joe Dziedzic
 Ryan Dzingel
 David Dziurzynski

See also
 hockeydb.com NHL Player List - D

Players